is a 2015 Japanese comedy drama suspense film directed by Junichi Ishikawa. It was released on April 1, 2015.

Plot
In one of the subplots in this film, Ayumi Nitta (Erika Toda) suffers from anthropophobia (extreme shyness & fear of people). She works as a janitor at a hospital. She had a one-night stand with Wataru Makino (Tori Matsuzaka) who is a sex addict and a womanizer getting his way with beautiful women by lying about being a very good surgeon and many other things. Ayumi later realizes that she is pregnant because of that one night stand. When she tells Wataru that she is pregnant, Wataru believes she is a making a bad April Fools joke. Wataru Makino then takes flight attendant Reiko (Nanao) out to an Italian restaurant. He doesn't know that Ayumi Nitta is going to the same restaurant, after he mentioned it when she called him, to confront him to take responsibility for getting her pregnant which escalated to a major incident. Other subplots involve a student (Seishuu Uragami) who thinks he is an alien after reading messages he received via internet, an old lady (Lily) who is being suspected by a police detective (Masanobu Takashima) of being a con offering some kind of shaman service, a middle aged couple (Kotaro Satomi, Sumiko Fuji) pretending to be Japanese royalties to fulfill the dying wife's wish, a 'kidnapped' school student (Minami Hamabe) and her family, and two friends (Masataka Kubota, Masato Yano) who stay together one being a homosexual. All the things that happened in these subplots occurred on April 1st which could be or is mistaken to be April fools prank.

Cast
Erika Toda as Ayumi Nitta
Tori Matsuzaka as Makino
Yūsuke Santamaria as a receptionist
Yukiyoshi Ozawa as a chef
Sayaka Yamaguchi as a mother
Masanobu Takashima as a detective Ono
Eiko Koike as a punk woman
Kotaro Satomi as Sakurakōji Yūmaro
Shigeyuki Totsugi as a husband

Reception
By April 5, the film had earned  at the Japanese box office.

References

External links
 
 エイプリルフールズ(2015) at allcinema 
 エイプリルフールズ at KINENOTE 

Japanese comedy-drama films
2015 comedy-drama films
2015 comedy films
Films scored by Yuki Hayashi
2010s Japanese films